Emil Møller (19 January 1905 – 16 September 1993) was a Danish footballer. He played in three matches for the Denmark national football team from 1932 to 1933.

References

External links
 

1905 births
1993 deaths
Danish men's footballers
Denmark international footballers
Place of birth missing
Association footballers not categorized by position